Himantolophus multifurcatus is a species of footballfish, a type of anglerfish. It is endemic to the east central Atlantic Ocean.

References

Himantolophidae
Deep sea fish
Fish described in 1988